Pseudodiaptomidae is a family of crustaceans belonging to the order Calanoida.

Genera:
 Archidiaptomus Madhupratap & Haridas, 1978
 Calanipeda Krichagin, 1873
 Parapoppella Sars, 2020
 Pseudodiaptomus Herrick, 1884

References

Calanoida